Bertha Züricher or Berthe Zuricker (20 March 1869 – 7 October 1949) was a Swiss author, painter and engraver.

Life
Züricher was born in Bern on 20 March 1869.

She was known for her paintings and engravings of genre scenes, landscapes and figures, but she was also a writer.

Zuricher's paintings were exhibited at the Société Nationale des Beaux-Arts in Paris. In November 1904 Ambroise Vollard chose her paintings of flowers and fruits to be exhibited.

In 1928 Zuricher published Postkarte, Herrn Wartman.

Death and legacy
Züricher died in 1949 in Bern. She was given a large retrospective exhibition in the year after she died.

Paintings in Bern collections are Hunter on the Look-out and In the Cradle. In 2004, Kurt Jakob Egli wrote Bertha Züricher: Leben und Werk der Berner Malerin.

In 2012 there was a retrospective exhibition of her work at Archivarte Galerie im Breitenrain.

References

1869 births
1949 deaths
Writers from Bern
Swiss women painters
Swiss engravers
Women engravers
19th-century Swiss women writers
19th-century engravers
19th-century Swiss painters
19th-century Swiss women artists
20th-century Swiss women writers
20th-century engravers
20th-century Swiss painters
20th-century Swiss women artists
Artists from Bern